Auvers may refer to the following communes in France:

 Auvers, Haute-Loire
 Auvers, Manche
 Auvers-le-Hamon, in the Sarthe département 
 Auvers-Saint-Georges, in the Essonne département
 Auvers-sous-Montfaucon, in the Sarthe département 
 Auvers-sur-Oise, in the Val-d'Oise département

Other uses
 Auvers is a former French name for Antwerp, Belgium; the modern name is Anvers